PRW, or prw, may refer to:

 Paso Robles Wine Services, a multi-winery processing and warehouse facility located in Paso Robles, California.
 PRW Racing, a defunct NASCAR auto racing team
 PRW, the IATA code for Prentice Airport, Wisconsin, US
 prw, the ISO 639-3 code for the Parawen language of Papua New Guinea
 PRW, the National Rail code for Perranwell railway station, Cornwall, UK
 Psychological Research Wing, a former name for the Defence Institute of Psychological Research in India

See also